Lycastris austeni is a species of syrphid fly in the family Syrphidae. It is typically found in the UK.

Distribution
India.

References

Eristalinae
Insects described in 1923
Diptera of Asia
Taxa named by Enrico Adelelmo Brunetti